Poul Thomsen (15 February 1922 – 16 December 1988) was a Danish film actor. He appeared in 70 films between 1944 and 1985. He was born in Præstø, Denmark and died in Denmark.

Selected filmography

 Otte akkorder - 1944
 Lejlighed til leje - 1949
 Vores fjerde far - 1951
 Far til fire - 1953
 Spion 503 - 1958
 Styrmand Karlsen - 1958
 Helle for Helene - 1959
 Forelsket i København - 1960
 Skibet er ladet med - 1960
 Komtessen - 1961
 Reptilicus - 1961
 Ullabella - 1961
 Venus fra Vestø - 1962
 Den kære familie - 1962
 Duellen - 1962
 Bussen - 1963
 Majorens oppasser - 1964
 Slap af, Frede - 1966
 Min søsters børn - 1966
 Soyas tagsten - 1966
 Mig og min lillebror - 1967
 Stormvarsel - 1968
 Olsen Banden (film) - 1968
 Kys til højre og venstre - 1969
 Olsen-banden på spanden - 1969
 Rend mig i revolutionen - 1970
 Den forsvundne fuldmægtig - 1971
 Olsen-bandens store kup - 1972
 Præsten i Vejlby (1972) - 1972
 Olsen-bandens sidste bedrifter - 1974
 Olsen-banden på sporet - 1975
 Familien Gyldenkål - 1975
 Hjerter er trumf - 1976
 Julefrokosten - 1976
 Familien Gyldenkål sprænger banken - 1976
 Olsen-banden ser rødt - 1976
 Affæren i Mølleby - 1976
 Blind makker - 1976
 Olsen-banden deruda' - 1977
 Firmaskovturen - 1978
 Fængslende feriedage - 1978
 Olsen-banden går i krig - 1978
 Trællenes oprør - 1979
 Olsen-banden overgiver sig aldrig - 1979
 Øjeblikket - 1980
 Danmark er lukket - 1980
 Undskyld vi er her - 1980
 Trællenes børn - 1980
 Jeppe på bjerget (film) - 1981
 Kniven i hjertet - 1981
 Olsen-banden over alle bjerge - 1981
 Pengene eller livet - 1982
 Johannes' hemmelighed - 1985
 Når engle elsker - 1985
 Den kroniske uskyld - 1985

External links

1922 births
1988 deaths
20th-century Danish male actors
Danish male film actors
People from Vordingborg Municipality